Caaguazú may refer to places in Paraguay:
Caaguazú Department
Caaguazú District
 Caaguazú, Paraguay, the capital of Caaguazú District